Pervez Sajjad Hasan (Urdu: پرویز سجاد حسن; born 30 August 1942, Lahore, Punjab) is a former Pakistani cricketer who played in 19 Tests from 1964 to 1973.

Family
He was one of seven brothers. One of his brothers was the Pakistan Test cricketer of the 1950s Waqar Hasan, and another was the film director and producer Iqbal Shehzad. His brother Waqar married Jamila Razaaq, the daughter of actress Sultana Razaaq, one of the earliest film actresses from India who acted both in silent movies and later in talkies. Jamila is also the granddaughter of India's first female film director, Fatima Begum and happens to be the great niece of Zubeida (the leading actress of India's first talkie film Alam Ara (1931)), who was the younger sister of her mother Sultana.

First-class career
Pervez Sajjad made his first-class debut in 1961–62 and took 22 wickets for 148 runs in his first two matches. He took 5 for 15 and 4 for 35 in Lahore A's innings victory over Railways in the Quaid-e-Azam Trophy, then took 7 for 33 (all bowled) and 6 for 65 against Combined Services, although Combined Services won.

His best innings and match figures were 7 for 23 and 8 for 89 – 15 for 112 in the match – for Karachi against Khairpur in 1968–69 in a quarter-final of the Quaid-e-Azam Trophy. He played first-class cricket until 1973–74.

Test career 
He played 19 Tests for Pakistan as a cunning left-arm legspinner whose forte was that he was effective even on unhelpful tracks. In all, he took 59 economical wickets, including five wickets in an innings three times, always against New Zealand. At Auckland in 1964–65 he finished with 5 for 42. In the 1969–70 series, he took 22 wickets at only 15.63, including 5 for 33 at Karachi and his Test-best 7 for 74 at Lahore.

Later career
He worked as an assistant to his brother Iqbal Shehzad on several films. His major career was with Pakistan International Airlines, for whom when he retired he was General Manager in Paris.

References

External links

1942 births
Living people
Pakistan Test cricketers
Pakistani cricketers
Lahore A cricketers
Lahore cricketers
Pakistan International Airlines cricketers
Pakistan International Airlines A cricketers
Karachi cricketers
Pakistan Eaglets cricketers
Lahore Greens cricketers